"The Light in Me" is a song by contemporary Christian musician Brandon Heath from his third studio album, Leaving Eden. It was released on April 29, 2011, as the second single from the album.

Background 
This song was produced by Dan Muckala.  According to Brandon Heath, the song is about how he "wanted to talk about where [he] came from and [his]...story. [He] had a conversation with a woman the other day, and she said there was something different about [him], so [he] told her it was Jesus. It's His spirit in us that draws people to us. It's an honor that He would put that light in us."

Composition 
"The Light in Me" was written by Brandon Heath and Dan Muckala.

Release 
The song "The Light in Me" was digitally released as the second single from Leaving Eden on April 29, 2011.

Video 
The song has had an official music video made of it, which can be viewed .

Charts

References 

2011 singles
Brandon Heath songs
Songs written by Brandon Heath
Songs written by Dan Muckala
Song recordings produced by Dan Muckala
2011 songs